Evolution is an album by jazz vibraphonist and pianist Teddy Charles recorded in 1953 and 1955 for the Prestige label.

Reception

The Allmusic review by Scott Yanow stated "Although somewhat overlooked in the jazz history books, vibraphonist Teddy Charles was for a period an important participant in the early Third Stream movement, using aspects of classical music to revitalize West Coast-style jazz... This session alternates cookers with sensitive ballads and is one of the better recorded showcases for Charles' vibes. Recommended".

Track listing
 "Violetta" (John Nielson) - 3:37   
 "The Night We Called It a Day" (Matt Dennis, Tom Adair) - 2:41   
 "Jay Walkin'" (J. R. Monterose) - 3:36   
 "Speak Low" (Kurt Weill, Ogden Nash) - 3:16   
 "Relaxo Abstracto" (Teddy Charles) - 5:23   
 "I Can't Get Started" (Vernon Duke, Ira Gershwin) - 7:10   
 "Free" (Shorty Rogers) - 4:18   
 "Evolution"  (Jimmy Giuffre) - 4:13  
Recorded in Los Angeles, California on August 31, 1953 (tracks 7 & 8) and at Van Gelder Studio, Hackensack, New Jersey on January 6, 1955 (tracks 1-6)

Personnel 
Teddy Charles - vibraphone, piano
Shorty Rogers - trumpet (tracks 7 & 8)
Jimmy Giuffre - tenor saxophone, baritone saxophone (tracks 7 & 8)
J. R. Monterose - tenor saxophone (tracks 1-6)
Curtis Counce (tracks 7 & 8), Charles Mingus (tracks 1-6) - bass
Shelly Manne (tracks 7 & 8),  Gerry Segal (tracks 1-6) - drums

References 

1957 albums
Prestige Records albums
Teddy Charles albums
Albums produced by Bob Weinstock
Albums recorded at Van Gelder Studio